Noel Mewton-Wood (20 November 19225 December 1953) was an Australian-born concert pianist who achieved international fame on the basis of many distinguished concerto recordings during his short life.

Life and career
Born in Melbourne, he studied with Waldemar Seidel at the Melbourne Conservatorium until the age of fourteen. After further study at London's Royal Academy of Music, he took private lessons from Artur Schnabel in Italy.

In March 1940, he returned to London for his debut performance at Queen's Hall, performing Beethoven's third piano concerto with the London Philharmonic Orchestra under Sir Thomas Beecham.  He then went on tour in the UK as assisting artist accompanying Viennese tenor Richard Tauber, and later performed in France, Germany, South Africa, Poland, Turkey and Australia.

Mewton-Wood also possessed considerable talent as a composer. His string trio was featured on the Second Boosey and Hawkes Concerts held at Wigmore Hall on 27 March 1943. He also composed music for films including Tawny Pipit (1944) and Chance of a Lifetime (1950).

During his time in London he lived in a house in Hammersmith Terrace and there would often host musical evenings and entertain his close friends Benjamin Britten and Peter Pears.

Mewton-Wood's The Times obituary of 7 December 1953 described his debut performance:

In 1952–53, while Britten was busy composing his opera Gloriana, he deputised Mewton-Wood to accompany his partner, tenor Peter Pears.

When only 31, Mewton-Wood committed suicide by drinking prussic acid (hydrogen cyanide), apparently blaming himself for the death from a ruptured appendix of William Fedrick, whom he lived with, feeling he had overlooked the early symptoms. Mr. Fedrick was suffering from the severe pain for two or three days before calling a doctor and was eventually admitted to Westminster Hospital for an immediate operation but he subsequently died. Mewton-Wood became distressed and was advised to check himself into the Atkinson Morley Hospital for psychiatric treatment where he stayed for five days. He was released but put under supervision. Mewton-Wood was found dead in his music room on 5 December 1953.

The notes written by a friend of Mewton-Wood, John Amis, for the reissue of the Bliss Concerto recording, confirm that Mewton-Wood was homosexual and was distraught at his lover's tragic death.

Benjamin Britten wrote Canticle III: Still falls the rain for a concert in Mewton-Wood's memory.

In 1962, his old teacher Waldemar Seidel auditioned the 7-year-old Geoffrey Tozer and declared "Noel has come back".  Noel Mewton-Wood had died eleven months before Tozer was born.

Repertoire 
In addition to Beethoven, Mewton-Wood's repertoire included:
 Sir Arthur Bliss's Piano Concerto (Bliss was so impressed with Mewton-Wood's many performances and his recording of the work that he wrote his Piano Sonata for him)
 Busoni's Fantasia contrappuntistica and Piano Concerto (a 1948 recording with Sir Thomas Beecham is the earliest complete recording of the Busoni concerto known to survive)
 Chopin's Piano Concerto No. 1 in E minor
 Hindemith's Ludus Tonalis
 Tchaikovsky's three piano concertos, Concert Fantasia and G major sonata
 Tippett's song cycle The Heart's Assurance, with tenor Peter Pears
 Works by Bartók, Britten (Mewton-Wood gave the world premiere of the revised version of Britten's Piano Concerto), Liszt, Schubert, Mahler and Schumann.

He also composed chamber music, a piano concerto, ballet music, and music for the films Tawny Pipit (1944) and Chance of a Lifetime (1950).

Books 
Noel Mewton-Wood features in Sonia Orchard's 2009 novel, The Virtuoso, which is narrated by a fictional obsessive admirer and sometime lover of Noel. The novel is informed by the author's own background as a pianist, and her interviews with many of Noel Mewton-Wood's friends and contemporaries.

References

Sadie, S. (ed.) (1980) The New Grove Dictionary of Music & Musicians, [vol. 12.]
Nixa label, CLP 1153, original recording, Chopin Piano Concerto No 1 in E Minor, Opus 11, Netherlands Philharmonic Orchestra, Mewton-Wood, Pianist, Walter Goehr, Conductor.

External links
 An interview with the Sonia Orchard, author of The Virtuoso
 Entry on Noel Mewton-Wood in Australian Dictionary of Biography

 
 

1922 births
1953 suicides
Australian classical pianists
Male classical pianists
Alumni of the Royal Academy of Music
Australian LGBT musicians
Suicides by cyanide poisoning
Musicians from Melbourne
LGBT classical musicians
Benjamin Britten
Pupils of Artur Schnabel
20th-century classical pianists
20th-century Australian musicians
20th-century classical composers
Australian classical composers
Australian male classical composers
LGBT classical composers
People educated at Carey Baptist Grammar School
20th-century British male musicians
Australian expatriates in the United Kingdom
Australian expatriates in Italy